Qader Marz (also Romanized as Qāder Marz; also known as Qāder Maz, Qāder Mazd, and Qādir Maz) is a village in Osmanvand Rural District, Firuzabad District, Kermanshah County, Kermanshah Province, Iran. At the 2006 census, its population was 45, in 10 families.

References 

Populated places in Kermanshah County